Alterian, Inc is a makeup and special effects company owned by makeup and special effects designer Tony Gardner.

Alterian, Inc. is known for their work with Daft Punk, helping create the musicians' signature helmets, and associate producing Daft Punk's first feature film, Daft Punk's Electroma.

References

External links
 

Special effects companies
Companies based in Los Angeles